Paul Mucureezi (born 11 February 1993) is a Ugandan footballer who plays as a midfielder for Kitara FC in the Startimes Fufa big league.

International career

International goals
Scores and results list Uganda's goal tally first.

References

Living people
1993 births
Ugandan footballers
Association football midfielders
Uganda international footballers
People from Ntungamo District
Uganda A' international footballers
2018 African Nations Championship players
Vipers SC players
Kampala Capital City Authority FC players
Mbarara City FC players